John William Pattison (10 April 1887 – 1970) was a footballer who played as an outside left for a number of clubs in the Football League.

References

1887 births
1970 deaths
Sportspeople from Durham, England
Footballers from County Durham
English footballers
Association football outside forwards
Leadgate Park F.C. players
Durham City A.F.C. players
Newcastle United F.C. players
Derby County F.C. players
Bristol Rovers F.C. players
South Shields F.C. (1889) players
Torquay United F.C. players
Grays Thurrock United F.C. players
West Stanley F.C. players
Bath City F.C. players
Glastonbury Town F.C. players
Warminster Town F.C. players
English Football League players